In South Africa, many events and sports took place, like Rugby and Football, in 1994.

Football (Rugby Union)
 4 April - New South Wales rugby union officials cancel the Waratahs' visit to Durban for a Super Seven match due to political violence in Natal

Football (Soccer)

April
 24 April South Africa (Bafana Bafana) beats Zimbabwe 1-0 at the Independence Stadium, Mmabatho in a friendly match

May
 12 May Bafana Bafana beats Zambia 2-1 at the Ellis Park Stadium, Johannesburg in the first Nelson Mandela Challenge match

June
 8 June Bafana Bafana loses to Australia 0-1 at the Hindmarsh Stadium, Adelaide, Australia in a friendly match   
 12 June Bafana Bafana loses to Australia 0-1 at Sydney Football Stadium, Sydney, Australia in a friendly match

September
 4 September Bafana Bafana beats Madagascar 1-0 at Mahamasina Municipal Stadium, Antananarivo, Madagascar in the African Nations Cup qualifiers

October
 15 October Bafana Bafana beats Mauritius 1-0 at the Odi Stadium, Mabopane in the African Nations Cup qualifiers

November
 13 November Bafana Bafana draw with Zambia 1-1 at the Independence Stadium Lusaka, Zambia in the African Nations Cup qualifiers   
 26 November Bafana Bafana beats Ghana 2-1 at the Loftus Versfeld Stadium, Pretoria in the Simba Cup   
 30 November Bafana Bafana draws with Ivory Coast 0-0 at the Boet Erasmus Stadium, Port Elizabeth in the Simba Cup

December
 3 December Bafana Bafana draws with Cameroon 1-1 at the Ellis Park Stadium, Johannesburg in the Simba Cup

See also
1993 in South African sport
1994 in South Africa
1995 in South African sport
List of years in South African sport

 
South Africa